Monopeltis sphenorhynchus, also known commonly as Maurice's slender worm lizard, Maurice's spade-snouted worm lizard, and the slender spade-snouted worm lizard, is a species of amphisbaenian in the family Amphisbaenidae. The species is native to southern Africa. There are two recognized subspecies.

Geographic range
M. sphenorhynchus is found in Botswana, Mozambique, and South Africa.

Habitat
The preferred natural habitats of M. sphenorhynchus are deep sand and alluvial soil.

Description
The body is uniformly pink, both dorsally and ventrally.

Reproduction
The mode of reproduction of M. sphenorhynchus is unknown.

Subspecies
Two subspecies are recognized as being valid, including the nominotypical subspecies.
Monopeltis sphenorhynchus mauricei 
Monopeltis sphenorhynchus sphenorhynchus

References

Further reading
Auerbach RD (1987). The Amphibians and Reptiles of Botswana. Gaborone, Botswana: Mokwepa Consultants. 295 pp. . (Monopeltis sphenorhynchus mauricei, p. 140).
Gans C (2005). "Checklist and Bibliography of the Amphisbaenia of the World". Bulletin of the American Museum of Natural History (289): 1–130. (Monopeltis sphenorhynchus, p. 37).
Parker HW (1935). "A new species of Amphisbænid Lizard from Bechuanaland". Annals and Magazine of Natural History, Tenth Series 15: 582–583. (Monopeltis mauricei, new species).
Peters W (1879). "Über die Amphisbaenen und eine zu denselben gehörige neue Art (Lepidosternon Wuchereri)". Monatsberichte der Königlich preussischen Akademie der Wissenschaften zu Berlin 1879: 273–277. (Monopeltis sphenorhynchus, new species, p. 275). (in German).

Monopeltis
Reptiles of Mozambique
Reptiles of Botswana
Reptiles of South Africa
Reptiles described in 1879
Taxa named by Wilhelm Peters